The 2010–11 season was AFC Ajax in the Eredivisie. They participated in the Champions League and Europa League. The first training of the new season took place on Sunday, 27 June 2010. The traditional AFC Ajax Open Day was held on Friday, 23 July 2010.

Pre-season 
In preparation for the new season, Ajax organized a trainings stage in Stubaital, Austria, from 5 to 11 July. During the training camp, friendly matches were played against Al-Ahly and Rapid București, while further practice matches were played against Ajax (amateurs), FC Horst, Porto, Rijnsburgse Boys and Chelsea.

Player statistics 
Appearances for competitive matches only

|-
|colspan="14"|Players sold or loaned out after the start of the season:

|}
Updated 15 May 2011

2010–11 selection by nationality

Team statistics

Eredivisie standings 2010–11

Points by match day

Total points by match day

Standing by match day

Goals by match day

Statistics for the 2010–11 season
This is an overview of all the statistics for played matches in the 2010–11 season.

2010–11 team records

Topscorers

Placements

 Maarten Stekelenburg is voted Player of the year by the supporters of AFC Ajax.
 Christian Eriksen is voted Talent of the year by the supporters of AFC Ajax.
 Christian Eriksen is voted Dutch Football Talent of the Year by De Telegraaf and Football International.

Competitions
All times are in CEST

Johan Cruyff Shield

Eredivisie

KNVB Cup

UEFA Champions League

Third qualifying round

Play-off round

Group stage

UEFA Europa League

Knockout phase

Round of 32

Round of 16

Friendlies

Transfers for 2010–11

Summer transfer window 
For a list of all Dutch football transfers in the summer window (1 July 2010 to 1 September 2010) please see List of Dutch football transfers summer 2010.

Arrivals 
 The following players moved to Ajax.

Departures 
 The following players moved from Ajax.

Winter transfer window 
For a list of all Dutch football transfers in the winter window (1 January 2011 to 1 February 2011) please see List of Dutch football transfers winter 2010–11.

Arrivals 
 The following players moved to Ajax.

Departures 
 The following players moved from Ajax.

References

External links 
Ajax Amsterdam Official Website in Nederlandse
UEFA Website

Ajax
AFC Ajax seasons
Ajax
Ajax
Dutch football championship-winning seasons